The International Federation of Consulting Engineers (commonly known as FIDIC, acronym for its French name Fédération Internationale Des Ingénieurs-Conseils) is an international standards organization for construction technology and consulting engineering. The organization is best known for the FIDIC suite of contract templates.

History 
There were 59 participants at the inaugural meeting during a World Exhibition in Ghent, Belgium, in July 1913, called to discuss the possibility of forming a global federation of consulting engineers. Of these, 19 were official delegates from the US, Belgium, Denmark, France, Germany, Netherlands and Switzerland, with the remainder coming from AustriaHungary, Canada, Russia and the UK. This meeting led to FIDIC's formal constitution being adopted on 22 July 1993. Some countries maintained only provisional links during the first few years. The founding members of FIDIC were Belgium, France and Switzerland. FIDIC led a difficult life until the late 1940s with changing numbers of members, all from European countries. In 1959, these were joined by Australia, Canada, South Africa and the United States. The first member associations from the developing world, from Central Africa (now Malawi), Zambia and Zimbabwe, joined in 1962. Colombia joined in 1967. FIDIC has members in 104 countries.

In March 2018, Nelson Ogunshakin was appointed as the new CEO of FIDIC, to replace its retiring managing director, Enrico Vink. The current president is Anthony Barry, with Catherine Karakatsanis as the president-elect.

Services 
FIDIC has a mission of representing consulting engineering globally, including through promoting the interests of companies, organizations and engineers who provide technology-based services. The organization arranges a number of seminars and training courses, including the World Consulting Engineer Conference.

Standard form contracts 
FIDIC publishes international contracts and business practice documents which are used globally. The organization published an updated "rainbow suite" of contracts in 1999, which established a number of different conditions of contract depending on the circumstances of the works. The Red Book, which dates back to 1957, covers building and engineering works which are designed by the employer. The Yellow Book covers circumstances of design–build, where mechanical and electrical (M&E), building and engineering works are designed by the Contractor. The Silver Book covers projects which will follow the engineering, procurement and construction (EPC) and turnkey approach. The Green Book created a short form of contract. These revised contracts effectively superseded the Orange Book, which was published in 1995 to establish an option for design–build and turnkey, as it is common for the Yellow Book or Silver Book to be used in each relevant circumstance.

References

External links
 Official website
 FIDIC news

1915 establishments in France
Civil engineering organizations
Construction organizations
International organisations based in Switzerland
International organizations based in Europe
Organizations established in 1915
Construction law